Ani Fuk Chong Hoang (born 1 August 1991) is a Bulgarian singer of Vietnamese descent.

Biography 

Ani Hoang was born on August 1, 1991 in Sofia, Bulgaria. Her father is from Vietnam. She has an older brother and sister. She studied for five years at the School of Music Lubomir Pipkov in Sofia, with specialty Piano.

At the end of 2009, Ani signed a contract with Nikolay Parvanov – Chita. So she started working in Real Enterprises. On March 14, 2010 her first song Кой си ти (Who You Are) is released. Things, however, are not good for the singer because of misunderstandings with the owner of the company. After a series of media scandals related to the departure of Annie Hoang from Real Enterprises, she signed a contract with Payner in early April 2011. На 8 април 2011 On April 8, 2011, the video goes to Не вярвам (Do not Believe). The tape is all in Asian style and includes ninjas and a dragon. Despite the high-budget clip, the song is not very popular. Her second song, Payner, Лекарство за мъж (Medication for a Man), was released on June 18, 2011. The track achieved significant success in the charts, reaching 10th in the top 50 of the Signal music portal. Ani Hoang's next song bears the name И се будя пак (And I Wake Again) and appears in the air on Planeta TV in autumn 2011. On December 17, the clip goes to the song Неподготвен (Unprepared). For Planet's Christmas program, Annie shoots the ballad Тази нощ (Tonight) and shortly after, she also presents a new song Луда обич (Crazy Love). In March 2012, Annie Hoang won a 2011 debut in a series of annual awards for Planet TV and New Folk

Following are the songs Да си правим щастие (Let's Make Happiness, duet with Alex Linares), Ако от теб си тръгна (If You're Going Out), and Загасете светлините (Shut Out the Lights), the last of which becomes the biggest hit of the singer so far. On January 4, 2013 her debut album Лекарство за мъж" (A medicine for a man) appeared on the song of the same name. The album contains 12 tracks: 9 familiar compositions, one unrelated duet Онези малки неща (Those Little Things, with DJ Ned), an electronic remix of Луда обич, and symphonic version of Не вярвам.

Ani Hoang has released her first, and so far only album Лекарство за мъж“ in 2013.

At the end of February, Ani's new song titled Виетнамчето (Vietnamese) is released. With the vocals Ilian is included in the song. On June 7, the singer's latest project, titled Скрий му очите (Hide His Eyes), is released.

In the beginning of 2014, the singer's latest project – Да го правим (Let's Do It) – comes out. Ani Hoang's new video is on the song – Официална бивша (Officially Former) is coming out in June. It's the music of Avi Benedy. On June 21 she,  and Kristiana was promoted the song Между нас (Between Us) is the title of the new pop-folk song, which in music video was filmed popular Bulgarian actress in the subject line Latinka Petrova. On December 13, the song Боли да ме обичаш (You Love Me Loves) comes out with the clip, taking the singer with the vocals Azis and the music is the work of the singer's cowl. At the end of the year, Annie Hoang introduced her new song, Благодаря ти (Thank you), to the Planet TV fest, and the video comes out in early March.

On April 23, 2015, the new video came to the new song – Имам новина (I have a news). In the clip to the song, the performer relies on dancing, impressive effects and great looks. Choreography is performed by Ballet Fame. On September 23, she released her new video, which is for the singles Като нощ и ден (Like Night and Day). At the end of the year, she presented her new project titled Няма да те бавя (I Will not Hold You). On 29.02, released along with the clip and the song Стой далеч от мен (Stay away from me). On June 20, along with a video, comes the song На саниметри (Inches). At the beginning of September, with a video, the song Пак съм твоя (I'm yours again) is released.

In early 2017 Ani was released R'n'B remix of Луда Обич (originally Не си играй) with rapper Dgs Onemiconemc. In May 2017 was released music video of hip-hop song К'во ме гледаш (You look at me)

Personal life 
She is engaged with the director and singer – Ludmil Ilarionov since 2012.

Awards
Planeta TV Awards
2012: Debut of the year

Discography

Albums
Studio albums
2013 Лекарство за мъж (Medicine for a man)

Videos / Songs
From album Лекарство за мъж: 
2011: Не вярвам
2011: Лекарство за мъж
2011: И се будя пак
2011: Неподготвен
2012: Луда обич
2012: Да си правим щастие
2012: Ако от теб си тръгна
2012: Загасете светлините
Various
2013: Виетнамчето
2013: Скрий му очите
2013: Целувай и хапи
2013: Точно по мярка
2013: Ако питаш пиян ли съм (ремикс)
2013: Малко шум за Ани Хоанг
2014: Да го правим
2014: Официално бивша
2014: Между нас (with Kristiana (singer) and Galin (singer))
2014: Боли да ме обичаш (with Azis)
2015: Благодаря ти
2015: Имам новина. 
2015: Като нощ и ден 
2015: Няма да те бавя
2016: Стой далеч от мен
2016: На сантиметри
2016: Пак съм твоя
2017: Луда обич (R'n'B remix feat. Dgs Onemiconemc)
2017: К'во ме гледаш

Filmography

References

1991 births
Bulgarian folk singers
21st-century Bulgarian women singers
Bulgarian people of Vietnamese descent
Bulgarian folk-pop singers
Bulgarian rappers
Living people
Pop rappers
Singers of Vietnamese descent
Women hip hop musicians